Eupanacra psaltria is a moth of the  family Sphingidae. It is known from Borneo.

References

Eupanacra
Moths described in 1923